Makwan Amirkhani (born November 8, 1988) is a Finnish mixed martial artist competing in the Featherweight division of the Ultimate Fighting Championship.

Background
Amirkhani was born in Kermanshah, Iran into a Kurdish family. The family fled from Iran to Iraq and settled in UNHCR's Al-Tash refugee camp. In the aftermath of the Iran–Iraq War, the family were resettled to Vaasa, Finland, around 1993. Growing up as a small-sized immigrant in Vaasa, Amirkhani was subjected to serious physical and mental bullying from daycare up until the upper comprehensive school. He moved with his family to Turku in 2004, where he went to the upper comprehensive school. Amirkhani moved to Kotka to study in a high school suited for students with professional sports aspirations. However, he dropped out of the school and moved back to Turku where he failed to graduate from high schools twice. Eventually on a third try, he was accepted to study in Pajulahti Sports Institute from where he graduated.

He hails from an amateur wrestling background, having trained since a young age, competing for the Finnish national team; winning silver in the Finnish National Championship in Freestyle in 2010 and bronze in 2013 in Greco-Roman wrestling.

Mixed martial arts career
Amirkhani began training in mixed martial arts at the age of 16 and had his first professional fight in 2010. Competing on the regional circuit solely in Finland, he compiled a record of 10–2, with eight finishes, all by submission and all in the first round, before signing with the UFC in December 2014.

Ultimate Fighting Championship
Amirkhani made his promotional debut against Andy Ogle on January 24, 2015 at UFC on Fox 14. He won the fight via TKO only 8 seconds into the first round. He also earned a Performance of the Night bonus.

Amirkhani was briefly linked to a bout with Diego Rivas on June 20, 2015 at UFC Fight Night 69. However, shortly after the bout was announced, Rivas was pulled from the fight due to undisclosed reasons and replaced by Masio Fullen. Amirkhani won the fight by submission due to a rear naked choke in the first round.

Amirkhani faced Mike Wilkinson on February 27, 2016 at UFC Fight Night 84. He won the fight by unanimous decision.

In January 2017, Amirkhani signed a new, four-fight contract with the UFC. In the first bout he faced Arnold Allen on 18 March 2017 at UFC Fight Night 107. He lost the fight by split decision.

Amirkhani faced Jason Knight on 27 May 2018 at UFC Fight Night 130 Amirkhani won the back-and-forth fight via split decision, after being knocked down twice with uppercuts.

Amirkhani faced Chris Fishgold at UFC Fight Night: Gustafsson vs. Smith on 1 June 2019. He won the fight via an anaconda choke submission in the second round. The win also earned Amirkhani his second Performance of the Night bonus award.

Amirkhani faced Shane Burgos on 2 November 2019 at UFC 244. He lost the fight via TKO in the third round.

Amirkhani was expected to face Mike Grundy at UFC Fight Night: Woodley vs. Edwards on March 21, 2020. Due to the COVID-19 pandemic, the event was eventually postponed and the bout scrapped. Instead Amirkhani faced Danny Henry on July 12, 2020 at UFC 251.  He won the fight via a submission in round one.

Amirkhani faced Edson Barboza, replacing Sodiq Yusuff, on  October 11, 2020 at UFC Fight Night 179. He lost the fight via unanimous decision.

Amirkhani was scheduled to face Nate Landwehr on June 5, 2021 at UFC Fight Night 189. However, Landwehr was pulled from the event due to injury and he was replaced by newcomer Kamuela Kirk. Amirkhani lost the bout via unanimous decision.

Amirkhani was scheduled to face Tristan Connelly on October 30, 2021 at UFC 267. However, Connelly withdrew in early September due to a neck injury and was replaced by Lerone Murphy. Amirkhani lost the bout via knock out with a knee after getting caught shooting for a takedown at the beginning of the second round.

Amirkhani faced Mike Grundy at UFC Fight Night 204 on March 19, 2022, in a rebooked bout after almost two years to date when they were originally set to compete. Amirkhani won the fight via a technical submission with an Anaconda choke in round one. With this win, he received the Performance of the Night award.

Amirkhani faced Jonathan Pearce on July 23, 2022, at UFC Fight Night 208. He lost the bout via TKO in the second round.

Amirkhani faced Jack Shore on March 18, 2023, at UFC 286. He lost the fight via a rear-naked choke submission in the second round.

Personal life
Amirkhani is one of eight children; his brother and father both died in car accidents shortly after the family moved to Finland.

Makwan has worked as a model and was the 1st runner-up in 2012 Mr. Finland pageant, which his nickname refers to.

On July 12, 2021 several Finnish newspapers reported that Jethro Rostedt, a Finnish real estate agent and town council member of Turku, filed a criminal report against Amirkhani due to threats and slander on Facebook, after Amirkhani posted negative comments regarding Rostedt and his son, after a gang fight with dozens of participants occurred in a nightclub owned by Rostedt the previous weekend.

Amateur boxing
Makwan Amirkhani has fought five times in amateur boxing. He would have had his fifth fight in December 2018 in Somero instead of January 2019, had he not refused a new replacement opponent who was an experienced and heavier boxer.

Championships and accomplishments

Mixed martial arts
Ultimate Fighting Championship
Performance of the Night (Three times) 

Nordic MMA Awards - MMAviking.com
2012 Showman of the Year
2015 Knockout of the Year vs. Andy Ogle on January 24
2015 Fighter of the Year

Amateur wrestling
Finnish Wrestling Federation
2010 Finnish Nationals 66 kg (145,5 lbs) Freestyle Wrestling Silver medalist
2013 Finnish Nationals 66 kg (145,5 lbs) Greco-Roman Wrestling Bronze medalist

Mixed martial arts record

|-
|Loss
|align=center|17–9
|Jack Shore
|Submission (rear-naked choke)
|UFC 286
|
|align=center|2
|align=center|4:27
|London, England
|
|-
|Loss
|align=center|17–8
|Jonathan Pearce
|TKO (punches)
|UFC Fight Night: Blaydes vs. Aspinall 
|
|align=center|2 
|align=center|4:10
|London, England
|
|-
|Win
|align=center|17–7
|Mike Grundy
|Technical Submission (anaconda choke)
|UFC Fight Night: Volkov vs. Aspinall
|
|align=center|1
|align=center|0:57
|London, England
|
|-
|Loss
|align=center|16–7
|Lerone Murphy
|KO (knee)
|UFC 267 
|
|align=center|2
|align=center|0:14
|Abu Dhabi, United Arab Emirates
|  
|-
|Loss
|align=center|16–6
|Kamuela Kirk
|Decision (unanimous)
|UFC Fight Night: Rozenstruik vs. Sakai
|
|align=center|3
|align=center|5:00
|Las Vegas, Nevada, United States
|
|-
|Loss
|align=center|16–5
|Edson Barboza
|Decision (unanimous) 
|UFC Fight Night: Moraes vs. Sandhagen
|
|align=center|3
|align=center|5:00
|Abu Dhabi, United Arab Emirates
|
|-
|Win
|align=center|16–4
|Danny Henry
|Technical Submission (anaconda choke)
|UFC 251 
|
|align=center|1
|align=center|3:15
|Abu Dhabi, United Arab Emirates
|
|-
|Loss
|align=center|15–4
|Shane Burgos
|TKO (punches)
|UFC 244 
|
|align=center|3
|align=center|4:32
|New York City, New York, United States
| 
|-
|Win
|align=center|15–3
|Chris Fishgold
|Submission (anaconda choke)
|UFC Fight Night: Gustafsson vs. Smith 
|
|align=center|2
|align=center|4:25
|Stockholm, Sweden
|
|-
|Win
|align=center|14–3
|Jason Knight
|Decision (split)
|UFC Fight Night: Thompson vs. Till
|
|align=center|3
|align=center|5:00
|Liverpool, England
|
|-
|Loss
|align=center|13–3
|Arnold Allen
|Decision (split)
|UFC Fight Night: Manuwa vs. Anderson
|
|align=center|3
|align=center|5:00
|London, England
| 
|-
|Win
|align=center|13–2
|Mike Wilkinson
| Decision (unanimous)
|UFC Fight Night: Silva vs. Bisping
|
|align=center|3
|align=center|5:00
|London, England
|
|-
|Win
|align=center|12–2
|Masio Fullen
|Submission (rear-naked choke)
|UFC Fight Night: Jędrzejczyk vs. Penne
|
|align=center|1
|align=center|1:41
|Berlin, Germany
|
|-
|Win
|align=center|11–2
| Andy Ogle
|TKO (flying knee and punches)
|UFC on Fox: Gustafsson vs. Johnson
|
|align=center|1
|align=center|0:08
|Stockholm, Sweden
| 
|-
| Win
|align=center| 10–2
| Yohan Guerin
| Decision (unanimous)
| Cage 26
| 
|align=center| 3
|align=center| 5:00
|Turku, Finland
|
|-
| Loss
|align=center| 9–2
| Adam Ward
| Decision (unanimous)
| Cage 24: Turku 3
| 
|align=center| 3
|align=center| 5:00
|Turku, Finland
|
|-
| Win
|align=center| 9–1
| Nayeb Hezam
| Submission (anaconda choke)
| Fight for Glory: First Round
| 
|align=center| 1
|align=center| 3:58
|Turku, Finland
|
|-
| Win
|align=center| 8–1
| Tom Duquesnoy
| Technical Submission (anaconda choke)
| Cage 21: Turku 2
| 
|align=center| 1
|align=center| 1:50
|Turku, Finland
|
|-
| Win
|align=center| 7–1
| Semen Tyrlya
| Submission (modified rear-naked choke)
| StandUpWar 3: Rising Stars
| 
|align=center| 1
|align=center| 3:03
|Tampere, Finland
|
|-
| Win
|align=center| 6–1
| Johannes Isaksson
| Submission (leg lock)
| Botnia Punishment 12
| 
|align=center| 1
|align=center| 1:50
|Seinäjoki, Finland
|
|-
| Win
|align=center| 5–1
| Kari Päivinen
| Submission (guillotine choke)
| Lappeenranta Fight Night 7
| 
|align=center| 1
|align=center| 2:23
|Lappeenranta, Finland
|
|-
| Win
|align=center| 4–1
| Aleksejs Povulans
| Decision (unanimous)
| Cage 18: Turku
| 
|align=center| 2
|align=center| 5:00
|Turku, Finland
|
|-
| Win
|align=center| 3–1
| Lauri Väätäinen
| Submission (heel hook)
| Cage 16: 1st Defense
| 
|align=center| 1
|align=center| 0:50
| Espoo, Finland
|
|-
| Loss
|align=center| 2–1
| Viktor Tomasevic
| Submission (triangle choke)
| Karkkila Fight Night 1
| 
|align=center| 1
|align=center| 2:45
| Karkkila, Finland
|
|-
| Win
|align=center| 2–0
| Markus Rytöhonka
| Submission (triangle choke)
| TF: Turku Sport & Extreme Expo
| 
|align=center| 1
|align=center| N/A
| Turku, Finland
|
|-
| Win
|align=center| 1–0
| Tadas Aleksonis
| Submission (rear-naked choke)
| TF 2: Champions Are Here
| 
|align=center| 1
|align=center| 1:21
| Turku, Finland
|
|-

Amateur boxing record 
{|class="wikitable" style="text-align:center; font-size:95%"
|-
!
!Result
!Record
!Opponent
!Method
!Round, time
!Date
!Location
!Notes
|-
|5
|Loss
|3–2
|style="text-align:left;"| Santeri Laine
|MD
|3
|January 19, 2019
|style="text-align:left;"| 
|style="text-align:left;"|
|-
|4
|Win
|3–1
|style="text-align:left;"| Jamil Mahdi
|SD
|3
|November 24, 2018
|style="text-align:left;"| 
|style="text-align:left;"|
|-
|3
|Win
|2–1
|style="text-align:left;"| Eetu Sankari
|MD
|3
|November 11, 2018
|style="text-align:left;"| 
|style="text-align:left;"|
|-
|2
|Win
|1–1
|style="text-align:left;"| Ari Nevalainen
|MD
|3
|October 27, 2018
|style="text-align:left;"| 
|style="text-align:left;"|
|-
|1
|Loss
|0–1
|style="text-align:left;"| Mico Hakkarainen
|MD
|3
|October 13, 2018
|style="text-align:left;"| 
|style="text-align:left;"|

See also
 List of current UFC fighters
 List of male mixed martial artists

References

External links

1988 births
Featherweight mixed martial artists
Mixed martial artists utilizing freestyle wrestling
Mixed martial artists utilizing Greco-Roman wrestling
Mixed martial artists utilizing Muay Thai
Mixed martial artists utilizing boxing
Finnish male mixed martial artists
Finnish male sport wrestlers
Finnish submission wrestlers
Finnish Muay Thai practitioners
Iranian Muay Thai practitioners
Finnish male boxers
Iranian male boxers
Finnish people of Kurdish descent
Finnish people of Iranian descent
Sportspeople of Iranian descent
Kurdish sportspeople
Sportspeople from Kermanshah
Iranian male mixed martial artists
Finnish expatriate sportspeople in Sweden
Finnish expatriate sportspeople in Ireland
Living people
Iranian emigrants to Finland
Ultimate Fighting Championship male fighters